Hou Jiachang (born 1942) is a Chinese former badminton player, born in Dutch East Indies.

Early life 
Hou was introduced to the sport of Badminton by his father when he was 8 years old. After high school in Semarang, Hou went to China in 1960 for further studies at Guangzhou Sport University.

Playing career 
It 1960, he joined the Guangdong provincial team. It was the time of Cultural Revolution in China and he rarely had any chance of competing in foreign tournaments. His first appearance at the International level came at GANEFO in 1963 where he won Men's doubles championship with Tang Xianhu and a silver medal at the singles event. In 1965, Chinese team visited Denmark and outlasted the top Danish players such as Erland Kops. In 1966, the Chinese whitewashed the Danish team 4–0 in front of 5,000 spectators in Beijing. In that friendly match, Hou partnered Fu Hanxun and won in straight games 15–6, 15–4 against Svend Pri and Per Walsøe. 

In 1972, Hou became a member of CCP and joined the National Badminton Team. He participated at the First King Mahendra Memorial International Friendship which took place in Nepalese capital of Kathmandu, where he won singles as well doubles titles. In 1973, Hou along with his team went to England and dominated the English players, winning all the disciplines except Mixed doubles. Meeting the Danish players again in a friendly encounter in 1973, Chinese team won 10–0, where Hou defeated Svend Pri. He also defeated Punch Gunalan in a tie with Malaysia in Kuala Lumpur. 

It was only in 1974 when IBF allowed Chinese players to compete in Asian Games held in Tehran. He emerged champion in Singles event, where he defeated his compatriot Fang Kaixiang and helped his team in winning the team event gold medal against Indonesia. At the age of 34, in 1976, Hou won the Asian Championship, defeating Liem Swie King in the final. He was crowned the Men's doubles World Champions in 1978 where he partnered Yu Yaodong and beat Thai pair in the final. He was felicitated with trophy by then Vice-Premier of China Deng Xiaoping after the match.

Coaching career 
Hou retired in 1979 and was the head coach of the Chinese team until 1993. A three-time national champion, he is credited with 15 World Championship titles as well as 4 Thomas Cup conquests. He also coached United States' players in 1994.

Playing style 
As described by Eddy Choong, Hou had an uncanny sense of anticipation plus a wide variety of strokes. His defence is impenetrable, very solid. And less of a power game.

Awards  
In 1986, the International Badminton Federation honoured Hou Jiachang with the IBF Distinguished Service Award. Hou was inducted into the International Badminton Federation (IBF, currently BWF) Hall of Fame in 2002.

Achievements

World Championships

Asian Games

Asian Championships

Invitational Tournament

Book

References 
 

 

1942 births
Living people
People from Semarang
People from Meixian District
Badminton players from Fujian
Chinese male badminton players
Badminton players at the 1974 Asian Games
Badminton players at the 1978 Asian Games
Asian Games gold medalists for China
Asian Games silver medalists for China
Asian Games bronze medalists for China
Asian Games medalists in badminton
Medalists at the 1974 Asian Games
Medalists at the 1978 Asian Games
Chinese badminton coaches